Hypercompe confusa is a moth of the family Erebidae first described by Herbert Druce in 1884. It is found in Mexico.

References

confusa
Moths described in 1884